Robinson Ekspeditionen 2016 is the eighteenth season of the Danish version of the Swedish television series Expedition Robinson. This season premiered on August 29, 2016. The main twist this season is that there are three tribes instead of the usual two. Of the three tribes one is comprised completely of men, another of women and a third of mostly couples. In the first episode of the season the one member of each tribe immediately forced to compete in an elimination challenge in which the losing contestant would be eliminated from the competition. Tina lost the competition to Mathias and Kim and was eliminated, however she returned in the following episode along with first voted out Katja following a series of voluntary exits. As the winner of the first challenge, Mathias earned his tribe immunity meaning they would not need to compete in the first immunity challenge. Beginning in episode two the winning tribe of the reward challenge would win immunity and exemption from the immunity challenge. Following his girlfriend Natasha's voluntary exit, Kim was ejected from the competition. In the second and third episodes both Jesper and Tina were eliminated after losing their respective duels.

Finishing order

Season summary

Voting history

 After losing the duel Nanna was penalized with 3 votes at tribal council, Rene 2 and Michelle 1.

 After losing the duel Mathias was penalized with an additional vote at tribal council.

 After losing the duel and individual immunity Michelle was penalized with two additional votes at tribal council.

 After losing the duel Henrik and Ulrik were each penalized with a vote at tribal council. Ulrik also came last in the individual immunity challenge and was penalized with another vote at tribal council.

As the loser of the duel Sanne was penalized with a vote at tribal council. As winner of the duel Richard had an additional vote to cast at tribal council.

As the loser of the duel and immunity challenge Nanna was penalized with two votes at tribal council. As Liza and Sanne both lost the immunity challenge they each received a penalty vote at tribal council.

Malou played the hidden immunity idol at tribal council and thus all votes cast against her were voided.

 After losing the duel Nanna was eliminated.

 After losing the immunity challenge Sanne was penalized with an additional vote at tribal council.

Sofie and Malou were each given an envelope in which one of them received an immunity at tribal council while the other was to compete in a duel against the eliminated player. The loser of the duel would be out of the expedition. Sofie's envelope contained immunity while Malou's stated duel. Malou would then dueled Liza and won. Liza was then eliminated.

External links

Robinson Ekspeditionen seasons
2016 Danish television seasons